Dadang Sudrajat is an Indonesian footballer who plays for Persib Bandung as a goalkeeper.

References
Dadang Sudrajat at goal.com

1979 births
Living people
Indonesian footballers
Persib Bandung players
Sundanese people
Sportspeople from Bandung
PSKS Krakatau Steel Cilegon footballers
Mitra Kukar players
Persikab Bandung players
Persitara Jakarta Utara players
Arema F.C. players
Liga 1 (Indonesia) players
Indonesian Premier Division players
Association football goalkeepers